Pete Matevich is an American former soccer player who earned four caps, scoring two goals, as a member of the U.S. national team in 1949.

Professional career
Matevich was a member of the Chicago Maroons of the North American Soccer Football League.  In 1946, he was the league’s second leading scorer behind Gil Heron with seven goals.  After the league folded in the fall of 1947, he moved to Chicago Slovak of the National Soccer League of Chicago.

National team
Matevich played earned his first cap with the U.S. national team in a June 19, 1949 loss to Scotland.  He went on to play three qualifying games for the 1950 FIFA World Cup.  He scored two goals in the last U.S. game, a 5–2 victory over Cuba.  Despite that contribution, he was not selected for the World Cup roster.

References

External links
 

United States men's international soccer players
North American Soccer Football League players
Chicago Maroons soccer players
National Soccer League (Chicago) players
Chicago Slovak players
Living people
American soccer players
Association footballers not categorized by position
Year of birth missing (living people)